Olavi Saarinen (18 October 1923, in Dragsfjärd – 30 November 1979) was a Finnish trade union activist and politician. He was at first a member of the Social Democratic Party of Finland and, after 1959, of the Social Democratic Union of Workers and Smallholders. He served as Minister of Social affairs and Health (13 April 1962 - 17 October 1963) and as a Member of Parliament (5 April 1966 - 22 March 1970).

References

1923 births
1979 deaths
People from Kimitoön
Social Democratic Party of Finland politicians
Social Democratic Union of Workers and Smallholders politicians
Ministers of Social Affairs of Finland
Members of the Parliament of Finland (1966–70)